Vanessa Davis may refer to:

 Vanessa Davis (actress), Australian actress
 Vanessa Davis (cartoonist) (born 1978), American cartoonist